Cyperus mapanioides is a species of sedge that is native to a large area in central and western Africa.

The species was first formally described by the botanist Charles Baron Clarke in 1901.

See also
 List of Cyperus species

References

mapanioides
Taxa named by Charles Baron Clarke
Plants described in 1901
Flora of Nigeria
Flora of Angola
Flora of Cameroon
Flora of Chad
Flora of Zambia
Flora of the Central African Republic